Princess Royal is a style customarily (but not automatically) awarded by a British monarch to his or her eldest daughter. Although purely honorary, it is the highest honour that may be given to a female member of the royal family, just under Queen Regnant. There have been seven Princesses Royal. Princess Anne became Princess Royal in 1987.

The style Princess Royal came into existence when Queen Henrietta Maria (1609–1669), daughter of Henry IV, King of France, and wife of King Charles I (1600–1649), wanted to imitate the way the eldest daughter of the King of France was styled "Madame Royale". Thus Princess Mary (born 1631), the daughter of Henrietta Maria and Charles, became the first Princess Royal in 1642.

It has become established that the style belongs to no one by right, but is given entirely at the sovereign's discretion. Princess Mary (later Queen Mary II) (1662–1694), the eldest daughter of King James II, and Princess Sophia Dorothea (1687–1757), the only daughter of King George I, were eligible for this honour but did not receive it. At the time they respectively became eligible for the style, Princess Mary was already Princess of Orange, and Sophia Dorothea was already Queen in Prussia. A Princess Royal has never acceded to the British throne, though Princess Victoria, the eldest daughter of Queen Victoria, was simultaneously Princess Royal and heir presumptive for a year until she was displaced by the birth of her brother Prince Albert Edward.

Princess Louisa Maria (1692–1712), the youngest daughter of King James II (died 1701), born after he lost his crown in the Glorious Revolution of 1688–1689, was considered to be Princess Royal during James's exile by Jacobites at Saint-Germain-en-Laye and was so called by them, even though she was not James's eldest living daughter at any time during her life.

The title is held for life, even if the holder outlives her parent the monarch. On the death of a Princess Royal, the style is not inherited by any of her daughters; instead, if the monarch parent of the late Princess Royal has also died, the new monarch may bestow it upon his or her own eldest daughter. Thus, Princess Louise was granted the style of Princess Royal by her father King Edward VII in 1905; she retained it until her death in 1931, over twenty years into the reign of her brother King George V. Only upon Louise's death did the title become available for George's own daughter, Princess Mary, who was granted the title in 1932, retaining it until her death in 1965. Because Mary outlived not only her father but also her brother King George VI, the title was never available during George VI's reign to be granted to his eldest daughter Princess Elizabeth (later Queen Elizabeth II), though she would have been eligible to hold it. In the event that Princess Anne dies during the reign of her brother King Charles III, then there would be no eligible royal princess; Princess Charlotte, the daughter of William, Prince of Wales, would only become eligible upon William's accession to the throne.

Customarily, when a princess marries, she still takes on her husband's title. If her husband has a lower title or style, her style as a princess remains in use, although it may then be combined with her style by marriage, e.g. HRH The Princess Louise, Duchess of Argyll or HRH Princess Alice, Countess of Athlone – if that princess had a territorial designation, she may cease its use. Exceptionally, however, a princess who has been granted the title of HRH The Princess Royal will not customarily combine it with her style by marriage. For example, Princess Anne has been Her Royal Highness The Princess Royal since being given the title in 1987; prior to that, her formal title was Her Royal Highness The Princess Anne, Mrs Mark Phillips.

List of title holders

The following is a complete list of women formally styled Princess Royal:

In fiction
In the House of M alternate universe of Marvel Comics, Elizabeth Braddock is the elder twin sister of the British King and bears the title Princess Royal.
The novel The Lady Royal, by Molly Costain Haycraft, is a fictionalized account of the life of Isabella de Coucy.  According to the narrative, Isabella was titled the Princess Royal and then later given the more 'adult' title of the Lady Royal by her parents.  This is a fabrication; although Isabella, as the eldest daughter of Edward III, enjoyed the special privileges that came with her rank, she could not have been titled the Princess Royal because the title was not used in England until long after her death.  The title of "the Lady Royal" has never existed.

Other uses
Princess Royal was one of the GWR 3031 Class locomotives that were built for and run on the British Great Western Railway between 1891 and 1915. 
The LMS Class 8P "Princess Royal" 4-6-2 was a type of express passenger locomotive built between 1933 and 1935 by the London, Midland and Scottish Railway.

Princess Royal is an abandoned town in the Western Australian Goldfields, named for Victoria, Princess Royal, daughter of Queen Victoria.

Five ships of the Royal Navy have been named HMS Princess Royal.

"The Princess Royal" is also the name of a folk tune from the British Isles, and of a morris dance performed to that tune.

In the Thai monarchy, the style of Sayamboromrajakumari for Princess Sirindhorn of Thailand is similar to the position of Princess Royal.

In the Kingdom of Tonga, Princess Sālote Mafileʻo Pilolevu is also the Princess Royal.

In a number of African monarchies, the title of the highest-ranking female royal by blood in the kingdom is often translated as Princess Royal. This usually happens in kingdoms that do not make use of the higher title of queen mother. Princess Elizabeth, Batebe of Toro in Uganda, for example, often has her title translated in this manner. This happens even though it has historically meant something closer to "queen sister".

References

Royal titles
 
Royal